The 2012 Premier League of Belize was the first season of the highest competitive football league in Belize, after it was founded in 2011. The season commenced on 11 February 2012.

League formation
In October 2011 teams were invited to apply for membership for the new Premier League of Belize. In early January 2012 it was announced that there will be 12 teams competing in the inaugural season. There were 6 teams from the North Zone and 6 teams from the South Zone. Each team played teams in their zone twice, with the top 2 teams from each zone advancing to the playoffs.

Teams

North Zone

South Zone

League table

North Zone

South Zone

Results

Round 1 

North Zone

South Zone

Round 2 

North Zone

South Zone

Round 3 

North Zone

South Zone

Round 4 

North Zone

South Zone

Round 5 

North Zone

South Zone

Round 6 

North Zone

South Zone

Round 7 

North Zone

South Zone

Round 8 

North Zone

South Zone

Round 9 

North Zone

South Zone

Round 10 

North Zone

South Zone

Playoffs

Semi-finals 

Game One

Game Two

Finals 

Game One

Game Two

Season statistics

Top scorers

(*) Please note playoff goals are included.

Hat-tricks

 4 Player scored 4 goals

References

Top level Belizean football league seasons
1
Bel